The Katherine Town Council is a local government area in the Northern Territory, established on 3 March 1978.

The Town of Katherine is an established residential township with a commercial area and rural areas on the outskirts of the town. The original inhabitants of the town were the Dagoman and Jawoyn Aboriginal people. European settlement of the area dates from 1871, following the construction of the Overland Telegraph Line. Growth of the town began to start from 1926, following the opening of the railway line. The township grew around the railway line. The most significant development occurred in the post-war years, aided by growth in the tourism industry.

The current mayor is Elisabeth Clark, who presides over a council with six aldermen. Meetings are held on the 4th Tuesday of every month.

Suburbs, localities and communities
Land within the Katherine municipality was divided in 2007 into bounded areas for the purpose of creating an address for a property.  The bounded areas within the Katherine urban area are called "suburbs", those in adjoining rural areas are called "localities" and those associated with aboriginal communities are called "communities".

Suburbs
Cossack
Emungalan	
Katherine	
Katherine East  	
Katherine South	
Lansdowne	 	
Tindal
Uralla

Localities
Claravale (part)	
Edith (part) 
Manbulloo		
Florina	
Venn

Communities
Binjari

References

External links
 Katherine Town Council
 Katherine community id

Local government areas of the Northern Territory